Hans-Dieter Krampe (6 January 1937 – 3 December 2019) was an East German footballer.

Career
The defender played over 250 matches in the East German top-flight for Vorwärts Berlin.

Between 1959 and 1965 Krampe won 28 caps for the East Germany national team.

References

External links
 
 
 

1937 births
2019 deaths
German footballers
East German footballers
East Germany international footballers
1. FC Frankfurt players
Association football defenders